In computer science, a rule-based system is used to store and manipulate knowledge to interpret information in a useful way. It is often used in artificial intelligence applications and research. 

Normally, the term rule-based system is applied to systems involving human-crafted or curated rule sets.  Rule-based systems constructed using automatic rule inference, such as rule-based machine learning, are normally excluded from this system type.

Applications

A classic example of a rule-based system is the domain-specific expert system that uses rules to make deductions or choices.  For example, an expert system might help a doctor choose the correct diagnosis based on a cluster of symptoms, or select tactical moves to play a game.

Rule-based systems can be used to perform lexical analysis to compile or interpret computer programs, or in natural language processing.

Rule-based programming attempts to derive execution instructions from a starting set of data and rules. This is a more indirect method than that employed by an imperative programming language, which lists execution steps sequentially.

Construction

A typical rule-based system has four basic components:

 A list of rules or rule base, which is a specific type of knowledge base.
 An inference engine or semantic reasoner, which infers information or takes action based on the interaction of input and the rule base. The interpreter executes a production system program by performing the following match-resolve-act cycle:
 Match: In this first phase, the left-hand sides of all productions are matched against the contents of working memory. As a result a conflict set is obtained, which consists of instantiations of all satisfied productions. An instantiation of a production is an ordered list of working memory elements that satisfies the left-hand side of the production.
 Conflict-Resolution: In this second phase, one of the production instantiations in the conflict set is chosen for execution. If no productions are satisfied, the interpreter halts.
 Act: In this third phase, the actions of the production selected in the conflict-resolution phase are executed. These actions may change the contents of working memory. At the end of this phase, execution returns to the first phase.
 Temporary working memory.
 A user interface or other connection to the outside world through which input and output signals are received and sent.

See also
 Rule-based programming
 Expert systems
 Rewriting
 RuleML
 TK Solver
 List of rule-based languages
 Learning classifier system
 Rule-based machine learning
 Rule-based modeling

References 

Rule engines